Pair skating was contested during the figure skating events at the 2006 Winter Olympics.

This event is performed by partners consisting of a female and male skater. The competition consists of two segments. A short program is skated first, with eight required elements performed within 2 minutes and 50 seconds. All pairs progress to the free skating, where each pair skates for 4 minutes and 30 seconds. There were 20 pairs who competed at the 2006 Games.

Short program
The pairs' short program was the first figure skating event of the Olympics, and took place on 11 February, with the free skating completed on 13 February. Two-time World Champions and Russians Tatiana Totmianina / Maxim Marinin were the pre-tournament favorites to win. They were expected to be challenged by two-time World Champions and reigning Olympic bronze medalists Shen Xue / Zhao Hongbo, but an injury to Zhao initially kept them out of contention for the gold medal. However, the team was able to get back into shape for the Olympics.

Totmianina and Marinin took the lead after the short program, with a score of 68.64 points. Zhang Dan / Zhang Hao of China, skating to Led Zeppelin's song Kashmir, ranked second with 64.72 points, followed closely by Maria Petrova / Alexei Tikhonov of Russia with 64.27 points. Close behind were two other Chinese pairs, Pang Qing / Tong Jian (63.19 points) and Shen Xue / Zhao Hongbo (62.32 points). Americans Rena Inoue / John Baldwin made history in the short program by landing the first throw triple Axel in Olympic competition, putting them in sixth place.

Free skating
In free skating, Totmianina / Marinin were described by NBC as "untouchable", and the pair scored a personal best 135.84 points in this segment for a combined score of 204.48. Their victory was described as "a rout" The pair had suffered a setback in 2004 when Marinin dropped Totmianina during a lift, putting her in the hospital with a concussion.

The Chinese pair of Zhang / Zhang were the last to take the ice on the night of the free skating. In trying to surpass the Russian pair, Zhang / Zhang attempted a throw quadruple salchow jump, never before completed successfully in competition. However, Zhang Dan fell on this element and suffered a painful injury to her knee. Since she was temporarily unable to continue, the music was stopped by the event referee. Upon the trainer's approval for Zhang Dan to continue, the couple continued their routine, skating with minor errors for the remaining four minutes. NBC reported that the entire crowd gave the pair a standing ovation and showed shots of their fellow competitors, including Totmianiana / Marinin, also standing. Finishing second in both parts of the competition, Zhang / Zhang received silver medals with an overall score of 189.73 points.

Their countrymen, Shen / Zhao, who were in fifth place after the short program, pulled up two places in the free skating to take the bronze medals, as they did at Salt Lake City four years earlier, with a total score of 186.91. They edged the third Chinese couple, Pang Qing / Tong Jian out of the podium by just 0.24 points.

Petrova / Tikhonov, who were in third place after the short program, dropped to fifth place overall. Germans Aljona Sawtschenko / Robin Szolkowy, who were in seventh after the short, scored the fifth best total of the free skating competition to go up on spot. Inoue / Baldwin were unable to complete their throw triple Axel in the long and dropped to seventh overall.

While Totmianina / Marinin extended the streak of gold medals in pairs for Russia and former Soviet Union to 12 consecutive Olympics, dating back to 1964, the silver medals for Zhang / Zhang are China's best ever achievement in Olympic figure skating. Up until this point, China had three bronze medals in figure skating: two from China's Chen Lu and one from Shen / Zhao.

Results

Short program

Free skating

Final standings

 WD = Withdrawn

Referee:
 Hely Abbondati

Technical Controller:
 Junko Hiramatsu

Technical Specialist:
 David Kirby

Assistant Technical Specialist:
 David Moellenkamp

Judges:
 Adriana Domanska
 Zoia Yordanova
 Marina Sanaya
 Reinhard Mirmseker
 Igor Fedchenko
 Pierre de Lacroix
 Evgeni Rokhin
 Anna Sierocka
 Kristina Houwing
 William Smith
 William Thompson
 Wang Yumin

References

External links
 Final Results
 Pairs Protocol

Pairs
2006 in figure skating
2006
Mixed events at the 2006 Winter Olympics